40th Ave & Airport Blvd–Gateway Park station (sometimes stylized as 40th Ave & Airport Blvd•Gateway Park) is a Regional Transportation District (RTD) commuter rail station on the A Line in Aurora, Colorado. The station is the fifth eastbound station from Union Station in Downtown Denver and second westbound from Denver International Airport. It is about 23 minutes from Union Station and 14 minutes from Denver Airport.

40th Ave & Airport Blvd–Gateway Park station is also served by several bus routes and was integrated into a preexisting 1,079-space park-and-ride lot at the station site.

The station opened on April 22, 2016, along with the rest of the A Line.

References

RTD commuter rail stations
2016 establishments in Colorado
Railway stations in the United States opened in 2016